Louis Vincent Gerstner Jr. (born March 1, 1942) is an American businessman, best known for his tenure as chairman of the board and chief executive officer of IBM from April 1993 until 2002, when he retired as CEO in March and chairman in December. He is largely credited with turning IBM's fortunes around.

Gerstner was formerly CEO of RJR Nabisco, and also held senior positions at American Express and McKinsey & Company. He is a graduate of Chaminade High School (1959), Dartmouth College (1963) and holds an MBA from the Harvard Business School.

Currently, Gerstner is the chairman of the board of directors of the Broad Institute of MIT and Harvard and chairman of the board of the Gerstner Sloan Kettering Graduate School of Biomedical Sciences.

Gerstner is the author of Who Says Elephants Can't Dance, the best-selling account of IBM's transformation; and he is the co-author of the book Reinventing Education: Entrepreneurship in America's Public Schools.

American Express 
Lou Gerstner joined American Express in 1978 and, under his leadership, the company's market share increased significantly by 1985. He achieved this by finding new uses and users for the card, such as college students, physicians, and women, as well as persuading corporations to adopt the card as a more effective way of tracking business expenses. He also created exclusive versions of the card for higher-end clients, such as the Gold Card and the Platinum Card.

As sales and profits rebounded, Gerstner was promoted to chairman and chief executive officer of AmEx's Travel Related Services in 1982, and president of the parent company in 1985. Although he claimed the position at the age of 43, Gerstner dismissed the speculation that his success was the product of being a workaholic. Gerstner told Leslie Wayne, "I hear that and I can't accept that. A workaholic can't take vacations and I take four weeks a year."

As chairman and chief executive officer of the Travel Related Services division, Gerstner spearheaded its successful "membership has its privileges" promotion. Not only was the division continually the most profitable in the company, but it also led the entire financial services industry. Despite these successes, Gerstner hit a ceiling at American Express, as chief executive James D. Robinson III was not expected to retire for another 12 years. During Gerstner's 11-year tenure at American Express, membership had increased from 8.6 million to 30.7 million. He left AmEx in 1989 to succeed Ross Johnson as chairman and chief executive officer of RJR Nabisco following its $25 billion leveraged buyout by Kohlberg Kravis Roberts.

IBM 
Gerstner was hired as chairman and CEO of IBM in April 1993.  The company's board had forced his predecessor John Akers to resign, looking first within the computer industry for his successor. However Apple's John Sculley, Motorola chairman George Fisher, and Bill Gates of Microsoft were not interested (other rumored candidates included Eckhard Pfeiffer of Compaq and Scott McNealy of Sun Microsystems). IBM then turned to Gerstner, an outsider with a record that suggested success whose older brother Richard had run the company's PC division until retiring due to health issues four years earlier. Gerstner was the first IBM CEO who was hired from outside the company.

Upon becoming chief executive of IBM, Gerstner declared: "the last thing IBM needs right now is a vision", as he instead focused on execution, decisiveness, simplifying the organization for speed, and breaking the gridlock. Many expected heads to roll, yet Gerstner initially changed only the CFO, the HR chief, and three key line executives.

In his memoir, Who Says Elephants Can't Dance?, he describes his arrival at the company in April 1993, when an active plan was in place to dis-aggregate the company. The prevailing wisdom of the time held that IBM's core mainframe business was headed for obsolescence. The company's own management was in the process of allowing its various divisions to rebrand and manage themselves — the so-called "Baby Blues."  Then-CEO John Akers decided that the logical and rational solution was to split IBM into autonomous business units (such as processors, storage, software, services, printers,) that could compete more effectively with competitors that were more focused and agile and had lower cost structures. Gerstner reversed this plan, realizing from his previous experiences at RJR and American Express that there remained a vital need for a broad-based information technology integrator. He discovered that the biggest problem that all major companies faced in 1993 was integrating all the separate computing technologies that were emerging at the time, and saw that IBM's unique competitive advantage was its ability to provide integrated solutions for customers – a company that could represent more than piece parts or components—something he only learned by going beyond just listening to the proponents of different technologies within IBM. His choice to keep the company together was the defining decision of his tenure, as these gave IBM the capabilities to deliver complete IT solutions to customers. Services could be sold as an add-on to companies that had already bought IBM computers, while barely profitable pieces of hardware were used to open the door to more profitable deals.

One of the strategic visions that Gerstner set for IBM in 1993 was to make e-business its heart and soul. He believed in the potential of B2B e-commerce and wanted to expand the application of the internet to more than just web-page browsing and consumer marketing. He argued that a network-centric approach would shift the workload from personal computers to larger enterprise-systems and allow the internet to be embedded into all aspects of business operations. IBM's initial vision for how e-business could transform the world included electronic debit services that would allow customers to place orders online and eventually shop at virtual stores, creating virtual databases of movies, books, and music that would be available from anywhere in the world, and more. Soon after, Gerstner announced e-business as IBM's growth strategy and formed the IBM Internet Division, led by Irving Wladawsky-Berger. In 1996, IBM's marketing department established the term e-business for any kind of business or commercial transaction conducted over the internet. Under Gerstner, e-business transformed IBM and within six years, they became the market leader in providing the products and services needed to transform any of their customers businesses into a network-centric e-business.

While IBM had been credited with turning the personal computer (PC) into a mainstream product, the company could no longer monopolize its market. A proliferation of cheaper IBM-compatible PC clones that used the same Intel chips and Microsoft operating system software simply undercut it and eroded market share. Outgoing IBM chairman and CEO Akers, a company lifer, was excessively immersed in its corporate culture, remaining loyal to traditional ways that masked the real threats. As an outsider, Gerstner had no emotional attachment to long-suffering products IBM had developed to try to regain control of the PC market. Gerstner wrote that in spite of OS/2's technical superiority to the dominant Microsoft Windows 3.0, his colleagues were "unwilling or unable to accept" that it was a "resounding defeat" as it "was draining tens of millions of dollars, absorbing huge chunks of senior management's time, and making a mockery of our image". By the end of 1994, IBM ceased new development of OS/2 software. IBM withdrew from the retail desktop PC market entirely, which had become unprofitable due to price pressures in the early 2000s. Three years after Gerstner's 2002 retirement, IBM sold the PC division to Lenovo.

In his memoir, Gerstner described the turnaround as difficult and often wrenching for an IBM culture that had become insular and balkanized. After he arrived, over 100,000 employees were laid off from a company that had maintained a lifetime employment practice from its inception. Long allowed by their managers to believe that employment security had little reference to performance, thousands of IBM employees had grown lax, while the top-performing employees complained bitterly in attitude surveys. In the goal to create one common brand message for all IBM products and services around the world, under Gerstner's leadership the company consolidated its many advertising agencies down to just Ogilvy & Mather. Layoffs and other tough management measures continued in the first two years of his tenure, but the company was saved, and business success has continued to grow steadily since then.

From 1993 to Gerstner's retirement in 2002, IBM's market capitalization rose from $29 billion to $168 billion. Despite his success Gerstner also presided over the company's decline, relative to newer rivals, as it lost its once-dominant position in the IT industry. Microsoft grew beyond just PC software in the 1990s, hardware companies Apple and Dell expanded their market share, and entirely new entities such as the Google search engine emerged and created new computer-based business empires. Gerstner was also the first highly-paid IBM CEO relative to his home-grown predecessors, earning a personal fortune of hundreds of millions in his role. His philosophy, quoted as "The importance of managers being aligned with shareholders—not through risk-free instruments like stock options, but through the process of putting their own money on the line through direct ownership of the company—became a critical part of the management philosophy I brought to IBM" has been criticized for IBM's management in the late 2000s becoming "fully isolated and immune from the long-term consequences of their decisions".

Post-IBM 

In January 2003, Gerstner assumed the position of chairman of The Carlyle Group, a Washington, D.C. global private equity firm. He served as chairman from January 2003 until October 2008 and upon retiring from that position, he continued as a senior advisor to Carlyle through September 2016.

Gerstner held the position of chairman of the Broad Institute of MIT and Harvard from January 2013 - through May 2021.

Gerstner established the Gerstner Family Foundation in 1989 and serves as the chairman. The Foundation primarily makes grants in Biomedical Research, Education, and Helping Hands. Gerstner Philanthropies, which encompasses all of Gerstner's philanthropic giving, has made over $180 million in grants to date. Most recently, in 2021, over $48 million was granted across all program areas.

Honors 
In 1991, Gerstner received the Golden Plate Award of the American Academy of Achievement.

Gerstner was elected a member of the National Academy of Engineering in 1999 for technical leadership in enhancing the competitiveness of U.S. industry.

In recognition of his work on behalf of public education, as well as his business accomplishments, Gerstner was awarded the designation of honorary Knight of the British Empire by Queen Elizabeth II in June 2001.

He has received numerous awards for his work in education, among them the Cleveland E. Dodge Medal for Distinguished Service to Education - Teachers College, Columbia University, and the Distinguished Service to Science and Education award from the American Museum of Natural History. In 2008, Gerstner received the Legend in Leadership Award from the Yale School of Management.

References

  
 Gerstner, Jr., Louis V. (2002). Who Says Elephants Can't Dance? HarperCollins. .

External links
Official biography of Louis V. Gerstner, Jr. 
Full Biographical Profile of Louis V. Gerstner, Jr.
IBM's biography of Gerstner
The Carlyle Group's biography of Gerstner
Website for the Gerstner Family Foundation

1942 births
American chief executives of Fortune 500 companies
American Express people
20th-century American Jews
American technology chief executives
Chaminade High School alumni
Dartmouth College alumni
Harvard Business School alumni
Honorary Knights Commander of the Order of the British Empire
IBM employees
Living people
McKinsey & Company people
Members of the Steering Committee of the Bilderberg Group
Members of the United States National Academy of Engineering
People from Mineola, New York
21st-century American Jews